Libi Haim (born ) is an Israeli female former volleyball player, playing as a setter. She was part of the Israel women's national volleyball team.

She competed at the 2011 Women's European Volleyball Championship.

References

1984 births
Living people
Israeli women's volleyball players
Place of birth missing (living people)